Chevreulia acuminata is a plant species in the genus Chevreulia. It is found in the South American countries of Argentina, Bolivia, Brazil, Ecuador, Peru, and Venezuela.

References

External links 
 
 Chevreulia acuminata at Tropicos

Gnaphalieae
Plants described in 1830